Kushchyovskaya is an airbase of the Russian Air Force located at Kushchyovskaya, Krasnodar Krai, Russia.

The base is home to the 797th Training Aviation Regiment.

References

Russian Air Force bases